Gaston Alancourt (10 February 1888 – 4 November 1964) was a French cyclist. He competed at the 1912 Summer Olympics and the 1920 Summer Olympics.

References

External links
 

1888 births
1964 deaths
French male cyclists
Olympic cyclists of France
Cyclists at the 1912 Summer Olympics
Cyclists at the 1920 Summer Olympics
Cyclists from Paris